This article lists the orders of the Bacteria. The currently accepted taxonomy is based on the List of Prokaryotic names with Standing in Nomenclature (LPSN) and National Center for Biotechnology Information (NCBI)
and the phylogeny is based on 16S rRNA-based LTP release 132 by The All-Species Living Tree Project.

Phylogeny 
National Center for Biotechnology Information (NCBI) taxonomy was initially used to decorate the genome tree via tax2tree. The 16S rRNA-based Greengenes taxonomy is used to supplement the taxonomy particularly in regions of the tree with no cultured representatives. List of Prokaryotic names with Standing in Nomenclature (LPSN) is used as the primary taxonomic authority for establishing naming priorities. Taxonomic ranks are normalised using phylorank and the taxonomy manually curated to remove polyphyletic groups.
 
Cladogram was taken from GTDB release 07-RS207 (8th April 2022).

Clade Terrabacteria

Phylum Chloroflexota

 Class ?"Bathosphaeria" Mehrshad et al. 2018
 "Bathosphaerales" Mehrshad et al. 2018 [DTDB tag: JG30-KF-CM66]
 Class ?"Umbricyclopia" Mehrshad et al. 2018
 "Umbricyclopales" Mehrshad et al. 2018 (TK10)
 Class "Limnocylindria" Mehrshad et al. 2018
 "Limnocylindrales" Mehrshad et al. 2018 (SL56)
 Class Ktedobacteria corrig. Cavaletti et al. 2007
 Ktedobacterales corrig. Cavaletti et al. 2007 (Thermogemmatisporales)
 Class Dehalococcoidia Löffler et al. 2013
 Dehalococcoidales Löffler et al. 2013
 Tepidiformales Kochetkova et al. 2020
 Class "Caldilineia" Oren, Parte & Garrity 2016 ex Cavalier-Smith 2020
 Aggregatilineales Nakahara et al. 2019
 Anaerolineales Yamada et al. 2006
 Ardenticatenales Kawaichi et al. 2013
 Caldilineales Yamada et al. 2006
 "Promineofilales" 
 Thermoflexales Dodsworth et al. 2014
 Class Chloroflexia Gupta et al. 2013
 Chloroflexales Gupta et al. 2013 (Herpetosiphonales, Kallotenuales)
 "Thermobaculales"
 Thermomicrobiales Garrity & Holt 2002 (Sphaerobacterales)

Phylum Dormibacteraeota
 Class "Dormibacteria" (sic) (AD3)
 "Dormibacterales" (sic)

Clade 1

Phylum Armatimonadota

 Class Abditibacteriia Tahon et al. 2018 (FBP)
 Abditibacteriales Tahon et al. 2018
 Class Fimbriimonadia Im et al. 2012
 Fimbriimonadales Im et al. 2012
 Class Chthonomonadia Oren, Parte & Garrity 2016
 Chthonomonadales Lee et al. 2011
 Class Armatimonadia Tamaki et al. 2011 (OP10)
 Armatimonadales Tamaki et al. 2011
 Capsulimonadales Li, Kudo & Tonouchi 2018

Phylum Eremiobacterota

 Class "Xenobia" Ji et al. 2021 (UBP9)
 "Xenobiales" Ji et al. 2021
 Class "Eremiobacteriia" corrig. Ward, Cardona & Holland-Moritz 2019 (WPS2)
 "Baltobacterales" Ward, Cardona & Holland-Moritz 2019
 "Eremiobacterales" Ward, Cardona & Holland-Moritz 2019

Clade Firmicutes

Firmicutes incertae sedis
 Class Thermolithobacteria Sokolova et al. 2007
 Thermolithobacterales Sokolova et al. 2007

Phylum Firmicutes E

 Class "Symbiobacteriia" 
 "Symbiobacteriales" 
 Class "Sulfobacillia" 
 "Sulfobacillales" Cavalier-Smith 2020
 Class "Thermaerobacteria" 
 "Thermaerobacterales"

Phylum Firmicutes G
 Class Limnochordia Watanabe, Kojima & Fukui 2015
 Limnochordales Watanabe, Kojima & Fukui 2015
 Class UBA4882
 Capillibacterium Ungkulpasvich et al. 2021 {UBA10575}
 Hydrogenispora Liu et al. 2014 {UBA8346}

Phylum "Selenobacteria"

 Class Selenomonadia Oren, Parte & Garrity 2016
 Acidaminococcales Campbell, Adeolu & Gupta 2015 
 "Anaeromusales" 
 "Dendrosporobacterales" 
 "Propionisporales" 
 Selenomonadales Marchandin et al. 2010
 "Sporomusales" Cavalier-Smith 2006
 "Acetonemaceae" {Sporomusales_A}
 "Pelorhabdus" {UMGS1260}
 Veillonellales Campbell, Adeolu & Gupta 2015

Phylum "Desulfotomaculota"

 Class 003054495
 "Carboxydocellales"
 Class Z-2901
 "Carboxydothermales"
 Class "Thermincolia" 
 "Thermincolales" 
 Class "Desulfotomaculia" Watanabe, Fukui & Kuever 2020
 "Ammonificales" 
 "Desulfotomaculales" Watanabe, Fukui & Kuever 2020
 Class "Moorellia" 
 "Calderihabitantales" 
 "Desulfitibacterales" 
 Moorellales Lv et al. 2020
 "Thermacetogeniales" 
 Class "Syntrophomonadia" 
 "Syntrophomonadales" 
 Class "Dehalobacteriia"
 "Candidatus Avidehalobacter" Gilroy et al. 2021 {UBA4068}
 "Candidatus Cryptoclostridium" Glendinning et al. 2020 {UBA7702}
 "Dehalobacteriales" 
 Class "Peptococcia" 
 "Peptococcales" 
 Thermanaerosceptrum corrig. Hamilton-Brehm et al. 2021 {DRI-13}
 Class "Desulfitobacteriia" 
 "Desulfitobacteriales" 
 "Heliobacteriales" Cavalier-Smith 2020

Phylum Firmicutes D

 Class "Proteinivoracia" 
 "Proteinivoracales" 
 Class "Dethiobacteria" 
 "Dethiobacterales" 
 Class "Natranaerobiia" Sorokin et al. 2021
 Natranaerobiales Mesbah et al. 2007

Phylum "Halanaerobiaeota"

 Class "Halanaerobiia" Cavalier-Smith 2020
 Anoxybacter Zeng et al. 2015 {DY22613}
 Halanaerobiales corrig. Rainey & Zhilina 1995
 "Halobacteroidales"

Phylum Firmicutes A

 Class "Thermosediminibacteria" 
 "Koleobacterales" Sakamoto et al. 2021
 Thermosediminibacterales Zhang et al. 2019
 Class "Thermoanaerobacteria" 
 "Caldicellulosiruptorales" 
 Thermoanaerobacterales Wiegel 2010
 Class Clostridiia Rainey 2010 em. Cavalier-Smith 2020
 "Acetivibrionales"
 "Caldicoprobacterales"
 "Christensenellales" 
 Clostridiales Prevot 1953 s.s.
 "Candidatus Egerieisoma" Gilroy et al. 2021 {UBA1212}
 Eubacteriales Buchanan 1917 
 "Lachnospirales" 
 "Lutisporales" 
 "Mahellales" 
 "Monoglobales" 
 "Oscillospirales" 
 Petroclostridium Zhang et al. 2018b {SK-Y3}
 "Peptostreptococcales" 
 "Saccharofermentanales" 
 TANB77
 Tissierellales Alauzet et al. 2020
 UBA1381

Phylum "Bacillota"

}}
 Class "Bacillia" Cavalier-Smith 2020
 "Alicyclobacillales" 
 "Aneurinibacillales"
 "Bacillidae" Cavalier-Smith 2020 non Enderlein 1917
 "Caldibacillaceae" {DSM-16016}
 Calidifontibacillus Adiguzel et al. 2020 {Bacillales C}
 Caryophanales Peshkoff 1939 [Bacillales A]
 Bacillales B
 Bacillales D
 Bacillales E
 Bacillales G
 Bacillales H
 Bacillales Prevot 1953 s.s.
 JC228
 Bacillales F
 "Brevibacillales" 
 "Caldalkalibacillales" 
 "Calditerricolales" 
 "Desulfuribacillales"
 DSM-22653
 "Erysipelotrichidae" corrig. Cavalier-Smith 2020
 Acholeplasmatales Freundt et al. 1984 (Anaeroplasmatales)
 "Candidatus Bathoplasma" corrig. Zhu, Lian & He 2020 {MAG-NZ}
 Culicoidibacterales Neupane et al. 2020
 Erysipelotrichales Ludwig et al. 2010
 Haloplasmatales Rainey et al. 2008 non Zhou et al. 2022
 "Izimaplasmatales" corrig. Zheng et al. 2021
 Mycoplasmatales Freundt 1955 (Entomoplasmatales, Mycoplasmoidales)
 RFN20
 RF39
 Turicibacteraceae Verbarg et al. 2020 {Haloplasmatales_A}
 "Exiguobacterales" 
 "Candidatus Harrysmithimonas" Glendinning et al. 2020 {CAJFEE01}
 "Kyrpidiales" 
 Lactobacillales Ludwig, Schleifer & Whitman 2010
 "Paenibacillales" 
 Pasteuria Metchnikoff 1888 {RES148}
 "Rubeoparvulales" 
 "Staphylococcales" 
 "Tepidibacillales" 
 "Thermicanales" 
 "Thermoactinomycetales" 
 "Tumebacillales"

Actinobacteriobiontes

Phylum Deinococcota
 "Deinococcia" Cavalier-Smith 2020
 Deinococcales Rainey et al. 1997 (Thermales) (radio-resistant micrococci)

Phylum Actinomycetota

 
 Class ?"Syntrophaliphaticia" corrig. Liu et al. 2020
 Class "Geothermincolia" Jiao et al. 2021
 Fen-727
 "Geothermincolales" Jiao et al. 2021
 Class "Humimicrobiia" Jiao et al. 2021
 "Hakubanellales" Merino et al. 2020
 "Humimicrobiales" Jiao et al. 2021
 Class "Aquicultoria" Jiao et al. 2021
 "Aquicultorales" Jiao et al. 2021
 "Geothermocultorales" Jiao et al. 2021
 "Subteraquimicrobiales" Jiao et al. 2021
 UBA3085
 Class Coriobacteriia König 2013
 Coriobacteriales Stackebrandt et al. 1997 (Eggerthellales)
 Class Rubrobacteria Suzuki 2013
 Rubrobacterales Rainey et al. 1997
 Class Thermoleophilia Suzuki & Whitman 2013
 Gaiellales Albuquerque et al. 2012
 "Miltoncostaeales" Li et al. 2021
 Thermoleophilales Reddy & Garcia-Pichel 2009 (Solirubrobacterales)
 Class Acidimicrobiia Norris 2013
 Acidimicrobiales Stackebrandt, Rainey & Ward-Rainey 1997
 "Actinomarinales" Ghai et al. 2013
 Class "Actinomycetia" Salam et al. 2020
 Acidothermales Sen et al. 2014
 Actinomycetales Buchanan 1917 (Bifidobacteriales; Micrococcales; Kineosporiales)
 Euzebyales Kurahashi et al. 2010 (Egibacterales)
 Jiangellales Tang et al. 2015
 Motilibacterales Salam et al. 2020
 Mycobacteriales Janke 1924 (Corynebacteriales; Actinoplanales; Actinocatenisporales; Antricoccales; Cryptosporangiales; Frankiales; Geodermatophilales; Glycomycetales; Jatrophihabitantales; Micromonosporales; Nakamurellales; Phytomonosporales; Pseudonocardiales)
 "Nanopelagicales" Neuenschwander et al. 2018
 Nitriliruptorales Sorokin et al. 2009 (Egicoccales)
 Propionibacteriales Patrick & McDowell 2015
 Salsipaludibacterales Almeida et al. 2022
 Sporichthyales Nouioui et al. 2018
 Streptomycetales Kampfer 2015 (Catenulisporales)
 Streptosporangiales Goodfellow 2015

Clade Cyanoprokaryota

Phylum "Margulisbacteria"

 Class "Saganbacteria" Carnevali et al. 2018 (WOR1)
 Class "Riflemargulisbacteria" Carnevali et al. 2019 (GWF2_35_9)
 Class "Marinamargulisbacteria" Carnevali et al. 2019
 Class "Termititenacia" Utami et al. 2019
 "Termititenacales" Utami et al. 2019

Phylum "Cyanobacteriota"

 Class "Sericytochromatia" Soo et al. 2017 (GTDB tag: S15B-MN24) [incl. "Blackallbacteria" (GTDB tag: UBA7694)]
 Class "Melainabacteria" Soo et al. 2014
 "Caenarcaniphilales" Soo et al. 2014
 "Gastranaerophilales" Soo et al. 2014
 "Obscuribacterales" Soo et al. 2014
 "Vampirovibrionales" Soo et al. 2015
 Class Gloeobacteria 
 Gloeobacterales Cavalier-Smith 2002
 Class Phycobacteria 
 Cyanobacteriales Rippka & Cohen-Bazire 1983 (Chamaesiphonales, Chroococcales, Chroococcidiopsidales, Nostocales, Oscillatoriales, Pleurocapsales, Spirulinales, Stigonematales)
 "Elainellales" 
 "Eurycoccales" 
 Gloeoemargaritales Moreira et al. 2016
 "Leptolyngbyales" 
 "Limnotrichales" 
 "Neosynechococcales" 
 "Phormidesmiales" 
 Prochlorococcaceae Komárek & Strunecky 2020 {"PCC-6307"}
 Prochlorotrichaceae Burger-Wiersma et al. 1989 {PCC-9006}
 Pseudanabenales Hoffmann, Komárek & Kastovsky 2005
 Synechococcales Hoffmann, Komárek & Kastovsky 2005
 Thermostichales Komárek & Strunecký 2020
 "Thermosynechococcales"

Clade Candidate Phyla Radiation

Phylum "Elulota"
 Class "Elulimicrobia" Rodriguez-R et al. 2020
 "Elulimicrobiales" Rodriguez-R et al. 2020

Phylum "Patescibacteria"

 Class "Wirthbacteria"
 Class "Dojkabacteria" (WS6)
 Class "Katanobacteria" (WWE3)
 Class "Microgenomatia"
 Clade GWA2-44-7
 Clade UBA1400
 "Curtissbacterales"
 "Daviesbacterales"
 "Gottesmanbacterales"
 "Levybacterales"
 "Roizmanbacterales"
 "Shapirobacterales"
 "Woykebacterales" (RIF34)
 Class "Absconditabacteria" 
 "Absconditabacterales" (SR1)
 "BD1-5" (GN02)
 Class "Gracilibacteria"
 "Abawacabacterales" (RIF46)
 "Fertabacterales" (DOLZORAL124_38_8)
 "Peregrinibacterales" (PER)
 "Peribacterales" 
 Class "Kazanbacteria" (Kazan)
 Class "Howlettbacteria" (CPR2)
 Class "Saccharimonadia" (TM7)
 "Saccharimonadales" corrig. McLean et al. 2020
 Class "Berkelbacteria" (ACD58)
 Class "Andersenbacteria" (RIF9)
 Class "Doudnabacteria" (SM2F11)
 Class "Torokbacteria" (GCA-2792135)
 Class "ABY1"
 ?"Brownbacterales"
 "Buchananbacterales" (RIF37)
 "Falkowbacterales"
 "Jacksonbacterales" (RIF38)
 "Kerfeldbacterales" (RIF4)
 "Komeilibacterales" (RIF6)
 "Kuenenbacterales"
 "Magasanikbacterales"
 "Moisslbacterales" [UBA2591]
 "Uhrbacterales"
 "Veblenbacterales" (RIF39)
 Class "Paceibacteria"
 "Azambacterales"
 Clade UBA6257
 Clade UBA9983
 Clade UBA9983_A
 "Montesolbacterales" 
 "Moranbacterales" (OD1-i)
 "Paceibacterales"
 "Parcunitrobacterales"
 "Portnoybacterales" (RIF22)
 "Ryanbacterales"  (RIF10)
 "Spechtbacterales" (RIF19)
 "Sungbacterales" (RIF17)
 "Tagabacterales" (RIF12)
 "Terrybacterales" (RIF13)
 "Yanofskybacterales"

Clade "Thermotogida"

Phylum Synergistota
 Class Synergistia Jumas-Bilak et al. 2009
 Synergistales Jumas-Bilak et al. 2009

Phylum Dictyoglomota
 Class Dictyoglomia Patel 2012
 Dictyoglomales Patel 2012

Phylum "Caldisericota"
 Class Caldisericia Mori et al. 2009 (OP5)
 Caldisericales Mori et al. 2009
 "Cryosericales" Martinez et al. 2019

Phylum "Thermodesulfobiota"
 Class "Thermodesulfobiia"
 "Thermodesulfobiales" Cavalier-Smith 2020

Phylum Coprothermobacterota
 Class Coprothermobacteria Pavan et al. 2018
 Coprothermobacterales Pavan et al. 2018

Phylum "Bipolaricaulota"
 Class "Bipolaricaulia"
 "Bipolaricaulales" (KB1 group, OP1)
 "Fraserbacterales" [GTDB tag: RIF31; RBG-16-55-9]

Phylum Thermotogota

 Class "Thermotogia" Oren, Parte & Garrity 2016 ex Cavalier-Smith 2020
 Mesoaciditogales Itoh et al. 2016
 Petrotogales Bhandari & Gupta 2014 (Kosmotogales)
 Thermotogales Reysenbach 2002 emend. Bhandari & Gupta 2014

Spirochaetobacteriobiontes

Phylum "Macinerneyibacteriota"
 Class "Macinerneyibacteria" corrig. Yadav et al. 2020
 "Macinerneyibacteriales" corrig. Yadav et al. 2020

Phylum "Muirbacteria"
 Class "Muirbacteriia"
 "Muirbacteriales"

Phylum "Riflebacteria"
 Class "Ozemibacteriia" corrig. Kadnikov et al. 2018 (RIF32/ACD39)
 "Ozemibacterales" corrig. Kadnikov et al. 2018

Phylum Spirochaetota

 Class "Leptospiria" Cavalier-Smith 2020
 Leptospirales Gupta et al. 2014
 "Turneriellales"
 Class "Brevinematia"
 Brevinematales Gupta et al. 2014
 Class "Brachyspirae"
 Brachyspirales corrig. Gupta et al. 2014
 Class Spirochaetia Paster 2020
 Sediminispirochaeta Shivani et al. 2016 {DSM-16054}
 Spirochaeta cellobiosiphila Breznak & Warnecke 2008 {DSM-17781}
 DSM-27196
 Marispirochaeta Shivani et al. 2017 {JC444}
 "Entomospira" Grana-Miraglia et al. 2020 non Enderlein 1917 {WRBN01}
 "Borreliales"
 "Sphaerochaetales" 
 Spirochaetales Buchanan 1917
 Spirochaeta thermophila Aksenova et al. 1992 {Spirochaetales_A}
 Spirochaetales_E
 "Treponematales" Song et al. 2021

Clade "Fusobacterida"

Phylum Fusobacteriota
 Class Fusobacteriia corrig. Staley & Whitman 2012
 Fusobacterales Staley & Whitman 2012

Phylum "Calescamantes"
 Class "Calescibacteriia" (EM19)
 "Calescibacteriales"

Phylum "Dependentiae"
 Class "Babeliae" Yeoh et al. 2016 (TM6)
 "Babelales" corrig. Yeoh et al. 2016

Phylum Campylobacterota
 Class Desulfurellia Waite et al. 2020
 Desulfurellales Kuever, Rainey & Widdel 2006
 Class "Campylobacteria" Oren, Parte & Garrity 2016 ex Waite et al. 2017
 Campylobacterales Garrity, Bell & Lilburn 2006
 Nautiliales Miroshnichenko et al. 2004

Scotobacteriobiontes

Clade 2

Phylum "Aerophobetes"
 Class "Aerophobia" (CD12)
 "Aerophobales"

Phylum Atribacterota
 Class Atribacteria Katayama et al. 2021 (OP9)
 Atribacterales Katayama et al. 2021 ("Caldatribacteriales")

Clade 3

Phylum Elusimicrobiota
 Class "Elusimicrobiia" Oren, Parte & Garrity 2016 ex Cavalier-Smith 2020 (TG1)
 "Elusimicrobiales" Geissinger et al. 2010
 Class "Endomicrobia" (sic) Stingl et al. 2018
 "Endomicrobiales" Zheng et al. 2018

Clade Planctobacteria

Phylum "Omnitrophica"
 Class "Omnitrophia" (OP3)
 "Omnitrophales" 
 Class Koll11 (OP3)
 "Candidatus Omnitrophus magneticus" Kolinko et al. 2016 {UBA1560}
 "Candidatus Velamenicoccus" Kizina et al. 2022 {UBA1572}

Phylum Chlamydiota
 Class Chlamydiia Horn 2011
 Hat2
 Chlamydiales Storz & Page 1971 em. Everett et al. 1999 (Parachlamydiales, "Anoxychlamydiales", "Simkaniales")

Phylum Verrucomicrobiota

 Class Lentisphaeria Cho et al. 2004
 Lentisphaerales Cho et al. 2004
 Oligosphaerales Qiu et al. 2013
 Victivallales Cho et al. 2004
 Class Tichowtungiia Mu et al. 2020
 Tichowtungiales Mu et al. 2020
 Class Kiritimatiellae Spring et al. 2017 
 "Candidatus Spyradenecus" Gilroy et al. 2021 {RFP12}
 Kiritimatiellales Spring et al. 2017 
 Class "Verrucomicrobiia" Oren, Parte & Garrity 2016 ex Cavalier-Smith 2020
 "Chthoniobacterales" Sangwan et al. 2004 (Terrimicrobiales)
 Opitutales Choo et al. 2007 (Puniceicoccales)
 "Pedosphaerales"
 "Methylacidiphilales" Op den Camp 2009
 Verrucomicrobiales Ward-Rainey et al. 1996 em. Yoon et al. 2008

Phylum "Saltatorellota"
 Class "Saltatorellae" Wiegand et al. 2019
 "Saltatorellales" Wiegand et al. 2019

Phylum "Sumerlaeota"
 Class "Sumerlaeia" Kadnikov et al. 2018
 "Sumerlaeales" Kadnikov et al. 2018

Phylum "Poribacteria"
 Class "Entoporibacteria" Podell et al. 2019
 Class "Pelagiporibacteria" Podell et al. 2019

Phylum "Hydrogenedentes" 
 Class "Hydrogenedentia"  (NKB19)
 "Hydrogenedentales"

Phylum Planctomycetota

 Class "Uabimicrobiia" Lodha, Narvekar & Karodi 2021 
 "Uabimicrobiales" Lodha, Narvekar & Karodi 2021 
 Class "Brocadiia" JLodha, Narvekar & Karodi 2021 
 "Brocadiales" Jetten et al. 2010 
 Class Phycisphaeria  Oren, Parte & Garrity 2016 
 Phycisphaerales Fukunaga et al. 2010
 Sedimentisphaerales Spring et al. 2018
 Tepidisphaerales Kovaleva et al. 2015
 Class Planctomycetia Ward 2020
 Gemmatales Dedysh et al. 2020
 Isosphaerales Dedysh et al. 2020
 Pirellulales Dedysh et al. 2020
 Planctomycetales Schlesner & Stackebrandt 1987 em. Ward 2011

Clade FCB group

Phylum "Marinimicrobia"
 "Candidatus Neomarinimicrobium" Rinke et al. 2013 corrig. Oren et al. 2020 (Candidate phylum SAR406; candidate phylum Marine Group A)

Phylum "Latescibacteria"
 Class "Handelsmanbacteria"  (RIF27)
 Class "Latescibacteria" 
 "Latescibacterales" (WS3)

Phylum "Krumholzibacteriota"
 Class "Krumholzibacteriia" corrig. Youssef et al. 2019
 "Delphibacterales" (DOLZORAL124_64_63; LZORAL124-64-63)
 "Krumholzibacteriales" Youssef et al. 2019 (UBP1)

Phylum "Fermentibacteria"
 Class "Fermentibacteria" Kirkegaard 2016 ("Aegiribacteria")
 "Fermentibacterales" Kirkegaard 2016 (Hyd24-12)

Phylum Gemmatimonadota
 Class "Glassbacteria" (RIF5)
 Class Gemmatimonadetes Zhang et al. 2003
 Gemmatimonadales Zhang et al. 2003
 Longimicrobiales Pascual et al. 2016

Phylum "Hydrothermota"
 Class "Stahlbacteria" (WOR-3) 
 Class "Hydrothermia" Chuvochina et al. 2019
 "Hydrothermales" Chuvochina et al. 2019 (EM3)
 LBFQ01 ["Pyropristinus" Colman et al. 2016]

Phylum "Cloacimonetes"
 Class "Cloacimonadia"
 "Cloacimonadales" (WWE1)

Phylum Fibrobacterota
 Class "Raymondbacteria" (RIF7)
 Class Chitinivibrionia
 Chitinivibrionales Sorokin et al. 2014 ("Chitinispirillales")
 Class Fibrobacteria
 Fibrobacterales Spain et al. 2012 ("Fibromonadales")

Phylum Calditrichota
 Class "Calditrichia" Cavalier-Smith 2020
 Calditrichales Kublanov et al. 2020

Phylum "Marinisomatota"
 Class "Marinisomatia" 
 "Marinisomatales" (SAR406)

Phylum Bacteroidota

 Class "Kapabacteria" (OPB56)
 "Kapabacteriales" 
 Class "Kryptonia" 
 "Kryptoniales" 
 Class "Ignavibacteriia" Oren, Parte & Garrity 2016 ex Cavalier-Smith 2020
 Ignavibacteriales Iino et al. 2010
 Class "Chlorobiia" Oren, Parte & Garrity 2016 ex Cavalier-Smith 2020
 Chlorobiales Gibbons & Murray 1978
 Class Rhodothermia Munoz, Rossello-Mora & Amann 2017
 Balneolales Munoz, Rossello-Mora & Amann 2017
 Rhodothermales Munoz, Rossello-Mora & Amann 2017
 Class Bacteroidia Krieg 2012
 Bacteroidales Krieg 2012 [Marinilabiliales]
 Chitinophagales Munoz, Rossello-Mora & Amann 2017 [Saprospirales]
 Cytophagales Leadbetter 1974 [Cyclobacteriales]
 Flavobacteriales Bernardet 2012
 Sphingobacteriales Kämpfer 2012
 "Sulfidibacteriales" Leng, Zhao & Xia 2022

Clade Proteobacteria

Phylum Acidobacteriota

 Class "Fischerbacteria" (RIF25)
 Class "Polarisedimenticolia" Flieder et al. 2021
 "Polarisedimenticolales" Flieder et al. 2021
 Class "Holophagia" Oren, Parte & Garrity 2016
 Acanthopleuribacterales Fukunaga et al. 2008
 Holophagales Fukunaga et al. 2008
 Thermotomaculales Dedysh & Yilmaz 2018
 Class "Aminicenantia" 
 "Aminicenantales" Kadnikov et al. 2019 (OP8)
 Class "Guanabacteria" (sic) Tschoeke et al. 2020
 "Guanabaribacteriales" corrig. Tschoeke et al. 2020
 Class Thermoanaerobaculia Dedysh & Yilmaz 2018
 Thermoanaerobaculales Dedysh & Yilmaz 2018
 Class Vicinamibacteria Dedysh & Yilmaz 2018
 Vicinamibacterales Dedysh & Yilmaz 2018
 Class Blastocatellia Pascual et al. 2016
 Blastocatellales Pascual et al. 2016
 "Chloracidobacteriales" 
 Class Acidobacteriia Thrash & Coates 2010
 Acidobacteriales Cavalier-Smith 2002
 "Acidoferrales" Epihov et al. 2021
 Bryobacterales Dedysh & Yilmaz 2018

Phylum "Chrysiogenota"
 Class Chrysiogenetes Garrity & Holt 2002
 Chrysiogenales Garrity & Holt 2002

Phylum Deferribacterota
 Class Deferribacteres Huber & Stetter 2002 em. Jumas-Bilak et al. 2009
 Deferribacterales Huber & Stetter 2002

Phylum "Thermosulfidibacterota"
 Class "Thermosulfidibacteria" Cavalier-Smith 2020
 "Thermosulfidibacterales" Cavalier-Smith 2020

Phylum Aquificota
 Class "Desulfurobacteriia"
 Desulfurobacteriales Gupta & Lali 2014
 Class "Aquificia" Oren, Parte & Garrity 2016 ex Cavalier-Smith 2020
 Aquificales Reysenbach 2002 emend. Gupta & Lali 2013
 "Hydrogenothermales"

Phylum "Modulibacteria"
 Class "Moduliflexia" Sekiguchi et al. 2015 (KSB3)
 "Moduliflexales" Sekiguchi et al. 2015

Phylum "Methylomirabilaeota"
 Class "Methylomirabilia"
 ""Methylomirabilales" 
 "Rokubacteriales"

Phylum "Tectomicrobia" 
 Class "Entotheonellia" 
 "Entotheonellales" Schmidt et al. 2000

Phylum Nitrospinota
 Class "Nitrospinia" Lucker et al. 2013
 "Nitrospinales" Lucker et al. 2013

Phylum Nitrospirota
 Class "Thermodesulfovibrionia" Umezawa et al. 2021
 "Thermodesulfovibrionales" Umezawa et al. 2021
 Class "Nitrospiria" Oren et al. 2015
 "Nitrospirales" Garrity & Holt 2001
 "Troglogloeales" Yu et al. 2022

Phylum Desulfobacterota G
 Class Syntrophorhabdia Waite et al. 2020
 Syntrophorhabdales Waite et al. 2020

Phylum SZUA-79
 Class SZUA-79
 "Acidulidesulfobacterales" corrig. Tan et al. 2019

Phylum Desulfobacterota

 Class Desulfuromonadia Waite et al. 2020
 Desulfuromonadales corrig. Kuever, Rainey & Widdel 2006
 Geobacterales Waite et al. 2020 
 Class "Zymogeniia" corrig. Murphy et al. 2021
 "Zymogeniales" Murphy et al. 2021
 Class Desulfomonilia Waite et al. 2020
 Desulfomonilales Waite et al. 2020
 Class Syntrophia Waite et al. 2020
 Syntrophales Waite et al. 2020
 Class Desulfobaccia Waite et al. 2020
 Desulfobaccales Waite et al. 2020
 Class Desulfarculia Waite et al. 2020
 "Adiutricales" Waite et al. 2020
 Desulfarculales corrig. Kuever, Rainey & Widdel 2006
 Class Desulfofervidia Waite et al. 2020
 "Desulfofervidales" Waite et al. 2020
 Class Dissulfuribacteria Waite et al. 2020
 Dissulfuribacterales Waite et al. 2020
 Class Thermodesulfobacteriia Hatchikian, Ollivier & Garcia 2002 em. Cavalier-Smith 2020
 Thermodesulfobacteriales Hatchikian, Ollivier & Garcia 2002
 Class Desulfobulbia Waite et al. 2020
 Desulfobulbales Waite et al. 2020
 Class Syntrophobacteria Waite et al. 2020
 Syntrophobacterales Waite et al. 2020
 Class DSM-4660
 Desulfatiglanales Waite et al. 2020
 Class Desulfobacteria Waite et al. 2020
 Desulfobacterales Kuever, Rainey & Widdel 2006

Phylum "Deferrisomatota"
 Class "Anaeroferrophilia" corrig. Murphy et al. 2021
 "Anaeroferrophilales" Murphy et al. 2021
 Class "Deferrisomatia" Waite et al. 2020
 Deferrisomatales Waite et al. 2020

Phylum "Binatota"
 Class "Binatia" Chuvochina et al. 2019
 "Binatales" Chuvochina et al. 2019

Phylum Myxococcota

 Class Myxococcia Waite et al. 2020
 Myxococcales (fruiting gliding bacteria)
 Class "Bradymonadia" 
 Bradymonadales Wang et al. 2015
 Class Polyangia Waite et al. 2020
 Haliangiales Waite et al. 2020
 Nannocystales (Reichenbach 2007) Waite et al. 2020 
 Polyangiales Tchan, Pochon & Prevot 1948

Phylum SAR324
 Class Lambdaproteobacteria Anantharaman et al. 2016 (RIF24)

Phylum Bdellovibrionota

 Class Bdellovibrionia Waite et al. 2020
 Bdellovibrionales Garrity, Bell & Lilburn 2006
 Class Bacteriovoracia Waite et al. 2020
 Bacteriovoracales Hahn et al. 2017
 Class Oligoflexia Nakai et al. 2014
 Oligoflexales Nakai et al. 2014
 Silvanigrellales Hahn et al. 2017

Phylum Leptospirillaeota
Class "Leptospirillia"
 "Leptospirillales"

Phylum Desulfobacterota_I
 Class Desulfovibrionia Waite et al. 2020
 Desulfovibrionales Kuever, Rainey & Widdel 2006

Phylum Pseudomonadota

 Class "Magnetococcia" Parks et al. 2018
 Magnetococcales Bazylinski et al. 2013
 Class "Mariprofundia" Cavalier-Smith 2020 ["Zetaproteobacteria"]
 Mariprofundales Makita et al. 2017
 Class Caulobacteria" Oren, Parte & Garrity 2016 ex Cavalier-Smith 2020
 Bartonellaceae Gieszczykiewicz 1939 {Rhizobiales_A}
 "Candidatus Enterousia" Gilroy et al. 2021 {Rs-D84}
 Holosporales Szokoli et al. 2016
 "Pelagibacterales" Grote et al. 2012
 "Candidatus Scatocola" Gilroy et al. 2021 {RF32}
 Sublass "Rickettsiidae" corrig. Ferla et al. 2013
 Rickettsiales Gieszczykiewicz 1939 emend. Dumler et al. 2001
 Sublass "Caulobacteridae" Ferla et al. 2013
 Clade UBA8366
 "Acetobacterales" 
 "Caedimonadales"
 "Azospirillales" 
 Caulobacterales Henrici & Johnson 1935 (Hyphomonadales; Maricaulales; Parvularculales)
 "Dongiales" 
 "Elsterales" 
 "Ferrovibrionales" 
 "Geminicoccales" 
 Hyphomicrobiales Douglas 1957 (Rhizobiales)
 Inquilinus Coenye et al. 2002 {DSM-16000}
 Kiloniellales Wiese et al. 2009
 "Methylospongiales" Podell et al. 2020
 Micropepsales Harbison et al. 2016
 "Micavibrionales" 
 Minwuiales Sun et al. 2018
 "Oceanibaculales"
 "Paracaedibacterales"
 "Parvibaculales"
 "Planktothermales" Zhou et al. 2020
 "Puniceispirillales" 
 "Reyranellales"
 Rhodobacterales Garrity, Bell & Lilburn 2006
 Rhodospirillales Pfennig & Truper 1971
 Sphingomonadales Yabuuchi & Kosako 2006 (Emcibacterales; Iodidimonadales; Kordiimonadales; Rhodothalassiales)
 Sneathiellales Kurahashi et al. 2008
 Stellaceae Hördt et al. 2020 {ATCC43930}
 Tagaea Jean et al. 2016 {CACIAM-22H2: CACIAM-22H2}
 "Thalassobaculales" 
 "Tistrellales" 
 "Zavarziniales" 
 Class Pseudomonadia" Oren, Parte & Garrity 2016
 ?"Ferritrophicales" Weiss et al. 2007
 ?"Kopriimonadales" Kwon et al. 2005c
 ?"Tethybacterales" Taylor et al. 2021
 "Thiohalorhabdales"
 Subclass "Acidithiobacillidae" Cavalier-Smith 2020
 Acidithiobacillales Garrity, Bell & Lilburn 2005
 Subclass "Neisseriidae" Cavalier-Smith 2020 (Betaproteobacteria)
 Burkholderiales Garrity, Bell & Lilburn 2006 ("Ferrovales"; "Gallionellales"; Hydrogenophilales; Methylophilales; Neisseriales; Nitrosomonadales; "Procabacteriales"; Rhodocyclales; Spirillales; Sulfuricellales)
 Subclass "Pseudomonadidae" Cavalier-Smith 2020
 "Taraoceanobacteraceae" Zhou et al. 2020 {UBA11654}
 Acidiferrobacterales Kojima, Shinohara & Fukui 2015
 Aquicella Santos et al. 2004 {DSM-16500: DSM-16500}
 Arenicellales Teramoto, Yagyu & Nishijima 2015
 Beggiatoales Buchanan 1957
 "Berkiellales"
 Cardiobacteriales Garrity, Bell & Lilburn 2005
 Chromatiales Imhoff 2005
 "Competibacterales" 
 "Coxiellales" 
 "Diplorickettsiales"
 "Ectothiorhodospirales" 
 Enterobacteriaceae_A
 Enterobacterales Adeolu et al. 2016 (Aeromonadales; Alteromonadales; Kangiellales; Orbales; Pasteurellales; Vibrionales)
 "Evansiales" 
 "Francisellales" 
 "Granulosicoccales" 
 "Halofilales"
 "Halothiobacillales" 
 Immundisolibacterales Corteselli, Aitken & Singleton 2017
 Inmirania Slobodkina et al. 2016 {DSM-100275: DSM-100275}
 Legionellales Garrity, Bell & Lilburn 2005
 Methylococcales Bowman 2005
 "Ca. Macondimonas" Karthikeyan et al. 2019 {UBA5335: UBA5335}
 Nevskiales Naushad et al. 2015 ("Salinisphaerales")
 "Nitrococcales"  
 "Nitrosococcales"  
 Pelagibaculum Knobloch et al. 2019 {HP12: HP12}
 "Piscirickettsiales" 
 "Porisulfidales" 
 Pseudomonadales Orla-Jensen 1921 (Cellvibrionales; Moraxellales; Oceanospirillales)
 "Candidatus Reidiella" Russell et al. 2019 {GCF-013343005: GCF-013343005}
 "Riflewellaceae" Zhou et al. 2020 {UBA4486}
 "Steroidobacterales" 
 Sulfuriflexus Kojima & Fukui 2016 {AKS1: AKS1}
 "Tenderiales" 
 Thioalbus Park et al. 2011 {DSM-26407: DSM-26407}
 Thioalkalispiraceae Mori K et al. 2011 {UBA6429}
 "Thioglobaceae" {PS1}
 Thiogranum Mori et al. 2015 {DSM-19610: DSM-19610}
 "Thiohalobacterales" 
 "Thiohalomonadales"
 "Thiohalospirales" 
 "Thiomicrospirales" 
 "Candidatus Thiopontia" van Vliet et al. 2020 {GCF-002020875: GCF-002020875}
 Thiotrichales Garrity, Bell & Lilburn 2005
 "Woeseiales" 
 Xanthomonadales Saddler & Bradbury 2005 non Chadefaud 1950a (Lysobacterales)

List of Candidate Phyla
 "Canglongiota" Zhang et al. 2022
 "Fervidibacteria" Rinke et al. 2013 (OctSpa1-106)
 "Heilongiota" Zhang et al. 2022
 "Qinglongiota" Zhang et al. 2022
 "Salinosulfoleibacteria" Tazi et al. 2006
 "Teskebacteria" Dojka 1998 (WS1)
 "Tharpellota" Speth et al. 2022
 "Tharpellales" Speth et al. 2022

See also 
 Branching order of bacterial phyla (Woese, 1987)
 Branching order of bacterial phyla (Gupta, 2001)
 Branching order of bacterial phyla (Cavalier-Smith, 2002)
 Branching order of bacterial phyla (Rappe and Giovanoni, 2003)
 Branching order of bacterial phyla (Battistuzzi et al.,2004)
 Branching order of bacterial phyla (Ciccarelli et al., 2006)
 Branching order of bacterial phyla after ARB Silva Living Tree
 Branching order of bacterial phyla (Genome Taxonomy Database, 2018)
 Bacterial phyla
 List of Archaea genera
 List of bacteria genera
 LPSN, list of accepted bacterial and archaeal names
 Human microbiome project
 Microorganism

References

Bacterial orders
 List of